Robert Watson (1866after 1889) was an English footballer who played in the Football League for Everton.

Robert Watson was born in Liverpool in 1866. Signed by Everton in August 1887 he scored ten goals in 14 games in his first season with the club. Watson had made his club debut as an inside—forward  in a first—round FA Cup tie against Bolton Wanderers in October 1887. Robert Watson, playing as a winger, made his League debut on 22 September 1888 at Wellington Road, the then home of Aston Villa. Everton were defeated by the home team 2—1 and Watson scored the solitary Everton goal. Robert Watson appeared in 18 of the 22 League matches played by Everton during the 1888–89 season and scored five goals. As a forward (15 appearances) he played in a forward line that scored three–League–goals–or–more on three separate occasions.

Watson was a sprightly forward, with good control, he was then switched to inside—right and had a sound first season of League action before losing his place to Welsh International Charlie Parry. He moved in 1889 to Gorton Villa FC.

References

Year of birth unknown
Date of death unknown
English footballers
Everton F.C. players
English Football League players
Association football forwards